The Burnt Bridge Creek Deviation is a 1.5 km stretch of freeway grade road in the Northern Beaches area of Sydney, New South Wales, Australia. Opened on 11 February 1985, it forms part of the A8 and is the only freeway grade section of that route. 

The road takes its name from Burnt Bridge Creek which flows beneath the road, although there is no sign of the "burnt bridge" which gives the creek its name.

It will ultimately form part of the Western Harbour Tunnel & Beaches Link, which will be a motorway-grade southward continuation of the Burnt Bridge Creek Deviation to the Warringah Freeway, then via a new tunnel under Sydney Harbour to the WestConnex.

Route
It begins just past the Spit Bridge and runs from Sydney Road, Balgowlah to Condamine Street, Manly Vale. There are no entry or exit ramps, and sound barriers run the entire length. Myrtle Street and Kitchener Street run over it but there are no access ramps to or from these roads. It runs, in a northbound direction, close to Frenchs Forest Road, then Brook Road, Bangaroo Street, Serpentine Crescent, Daisy Street, Myrtle Street, Kitchener Street, West Street, Griffiths Street then terminates at Condamine Street.

It is not tolled and runs in an arc around the south-east direction. The speed limit is 80 km/h for most of its length, reducing to 60 km/h prior to either terminus. The entire freeway grade road can be considered starting at the Spit Bridge and is 2.5 kilometres long with exit ramps on Battle Boulevard and Ethel Street also running over it. But the two freeway grade roads are cut in two because of the traffic lights where it intersects with Sydney Road.

The most direct alternative route is to go east on Sydney Road then north on Condamine Street.

Future Upgrades
Until the announcement of the Western Harbour Tunnel & Beaches Link project, the Burnt Bridge Creek Deviation sat for decades as an isolated oddity, reminiscent of many planned and never built freeways in the Sydney Basin, much like the Gladesville Bridge road complex. 

The original plans for the Warringah Freeway show the Burnt Bridge Creek Deviation as part of an expressway that would service the growing Northern Beaches area. Suggestions have been floated in the interim to connect the two freeways, with the aid of a tunnel, but it took almost four decades for concrete plans to be made for the connection.

In March 2017, the Government of New South Wales announced its intention to build the Western Harbour Tunnel & Beaches Link. Construction on the Western Harbour Tunnel commenced in 2022 and is expected to be complete in 2027-28. However, in June 2022 the NSW Government announced that Beaches Link and upgrades to Burnt Bridge Creek Deviation and Wakehurst Parkway would be shelved indefinitely, due to market constraints and labour shortages.

See also

 A8, Sydney

References

Highways in Sydney
Transport infrastructure completed in 1985
1985 establishments in Australia